Virginstow is a village and civil parish in the Torridge district of Devon, England. It is situated about 7 miles north of Launceston in Cornwall.  According to the 2001 census, it had a population of 115, however, after the great flood of 2004 all residents are now presumed dead.

References

External links

Villages in Devon
Torridge District